Bukas Luluhod ang mga Tala (Tomorrow the Stars Will Kneel) is a 1985 Filipino film by Viva films. Directed by Emmanuel H. Borlaza, story by Nerissa Cabral, and screenplay by Jose N. Carreon and Orlando Nadres. The film was released on July 11, 1984. The film stars Sharon Cuneta, Eddie Rodriguez, Gina Pareno, Pilar Pilapil, Tommy Abuel, Rey “PJ” Abellana, Raymond Lauchengco, Lani Mercado, Eula Valdez, and Janet Elisa Giron as young Rebecca. The film is about a girl who was born in a dirt-poor family who swore revenge to the rich family that kept wronging them.

The film is based on Nerissa Cabral's Pilipino Komiks Atlas Novel. The theme song "Pangarap na Bituin" is sung by Sharon Cuneta and composed by Willy Cruz.

Plot 
The movie is about an illegitimate child Rebecca (Sharon Cuneta) who swore revenge against her father Don Roman Estrella (Eddie Rodriguez) and her legitimate half-sisters Alice (Lani Mercado) and Monet (Eula Valdez). The film's title, "Bukas Luluhod ang mga tala", comes from her swearing revenge against the Estrella family.

Rebecca started performing and soon have a successful singing career. She planned on buying the Estrella home but relents and instead made peace with her father and her half-sister Monet. The film ends with Rebecca singing the chorus of “Pangarap na Bituin” while a montage of the movie plays.

Cast 

 Sharon Cuneta as Rebecca Rios
 Eddie Rodriguez as Rowel “Roman” Estrella
 Gina Pareño as Fidela Rios
 Pilar Pilapil as Monica
 Tommy Abuel as Ador
 Rey “PJ” Abellana as Dante Mandresa
 Raymond Lauchengco as Jun Rios
 Lani Mercado as Alicia “Alice”
 Eula Valdez as Monet
 Janet Elisa Giron as young Rebecca

 Mary Walter as Donya Concha
 Romeo Rivera as Rebecca’s lawyer
 Manny Castaneda as Bing
 Vangie Labalan as Pining
 Timmy Diwa as Ricky
 Charlon Davao as Young Jun
 Jennifer Sevilla as Young Alicia
 Christopher De Leon as special participant “Boyet De Leon”

Awards 
The film received 5 FAMAS nominations (Best Supporting Actress for Gina Pareno, Best Child Actress for Janet Elisa Giron, Best Story for Nerissa Cabral, Best Sound for Rolly Ruta, Best Musical Score for Willy Cruz) and won Best Sound and Best Musical Score.

The film also won the 1985 FAP Award for Best Sound Engineering.

References

External links 
 
Philippine drama films